Butler Balu is a 2019 Indian Tamil-language comedy film directed by M. L. Suthir. The film stars debutantes Gautham Krishna, Shalini Mayil, with Yogi Babu, Mayilswamy, Imman Annachi, Robo Shankar, Thadi Balaji in supporting roles. The film music was composed by Ganesh Raghavendra.

Cast 
 Gautham Krishna
 Shalini Mayil
 Yogi Babu as Chef
 Mayilswamy
 Imman Annachi
 Robo Shankar
 Thadi Balaji
 Sakthivel

Soundtrack

Release 
The film released on 8 October 2019 after being in deadlock for eight years. The makers additionally promoted Yogi Babu as the main actor despite the fact that the actor only shot for the film for four days. He plays the role of a chef in the film.

Reception 
Maalai Malar praised the music while criticizing the cinematography.

References

External links 
 

2010s Tamil-language films
2019 comedy films
Films shot in Chennai
Indian comedy films